The women's 5000 metres event at the 2007 Pan American Games was held on July 27.

Results

References
Official results

5000
2007
2007 in women's athletics